This is a list of artists signed to Motown or one of its many subsidiaries.

1950s & 1960s

A

 The Andantes (Motown Records)

B

 Rob Bauer (Gordy Records)
 J. J. Barnes (Ric-Tic Records)
 Blinky (Motown Records)
 Dorsey Burnette (Mel-o-dy Records)

C

 Choker Campbell & His 16-Piece Band (Motown Records)
 Chris Clark (V. I. P Records)
 The Chi-Lites
 The Contours (Gordy Records)
 Caroline Crawford (Motown Records)

D

 Debbie Dean (Motown Records)

E

 Billy Eckstine (Motown Records)
 The Elgins (V. I. P. Records)

F

 Four Tops (Motown Records)
 The Fantastic Four (Ric-Tic and Soul Records)

G

 Marvin Gaye (Tamla Records)

H

 Eddie Holland (Motown Records)
 Brenda Holloway (Tamla Records)
 Patrice Holloway (V. I. P. Records)

I

 The Isley Brothers (Tamla Records)

J

 Chuck Jackson (V. I. P. Records)
 Mable John (Tamla Records)
 Marv Johnson (Tamla Records)

K

 Gladys Knight & the Pips (Soul Records)

L

 Lovesmith
 Michael Lovesmith
 Shorty Long (Soul Records)

M

 Martha and the Vandellas (a.k.a. Martha Reeves & the Vandellas) (Gordy Records)
 The Marvelettes (Tamla Records)
 Barbara McNair (Motown Records)
 The Miracles (a.k.a. Smokey Robinson & the Miracles) (Tamla Records)
 The Monitors (V. I. P. Records)

O

 The Originals (Soul Records)
 The Ones (Motown Records)

R
 Barbara Randolph (Soul Records)
 David Ruffin (Motown Records)
 Jimmy Ruffin (Soul Records)

S

 Baker Sanusi (Motown Records)
 San Remo Golden Strings (Gordy Records)
 Edwin Starr (Soul Records)
 Barrett Strong (Tamla Records)
 The Supremes (a.k.a. Diana Ross & the Supremes) (Motown Records)

T

 Bobby Taylor & the Vancouvers (Gordy Records)
 R. Dean Taylor (V. I. P. Records)
 The Temptations (Gordy Records)
 Three Ounces of Love (Motown Records)
 Tammi Terrell (Gordy Records)

U
 The Underdogs  (V.I.P. Records)

V

 The Valadiers (Miracle Records)
 Earl Van Dyke (and the Soul Brothers) (Motown Records)
 The Velvelettes (V. I. P. Records)

W

 Jr. Walker & the All Stars (Soul Records)
 Mary Wells (Motown Records)
 Kim Weston (Gordy Records)
 Stevie Wonder (a.k.a. Little Stevie Wonder) (Tamla/Motown Records)
 Syreeta Wright (a.k.a. Rita Wright; Syreeta) (Motown Records)

1970s

A

 Gerald Alston (Motown Records)
 The Allens (Motown Records) (Special Note – Second All Caucasian Band to sign with Motown September 1974 after The Underdogs (1st Caucasian Motown act) signed in 1966.

B

 Brass Monkey (Rare Earth Records)

C

 G. C. Cameron (Motown Records)
 The Cats (Rare Earth Records)
 Tom Clay  (MoWest Records)
 The Commodores  (Mo-West and Motown Records)
 Crystal Mansion (Rare Earth Records)

D

 Bobby Darin (Motown Records)
 Kiki Dee (Tamla Records)
 The Dynamic Superiors (Motown Records)

E

 The Easybeats (Rare Earth Records)
 Duane Eddy (Motown Records)
 Dennis Edwards (Gordy Records)

H

 Hearts of Stone (V. I. P. Records)
 High Inergy (Gordy Records)
 Thelma Houston (Tamla Records)
 Howl the Good  (Rare Earth Records)
 Willie Hutch (Motown Records)
 Reuben Howell  (Motown Records)

I

 Impact of Brass (Rare Earth Records)

J

 Jackie Jackson (Motown Records)
 Jermaine Jackson (Motown Records)
 Michael Jackson (Motown Records)
 The Jackson 5 (Motown Records)
 Keff James (Rare Earth Records)
 Rick James (Gordy Records)

K

 Eddie Kendricks (Tamla Records)

L

 The Lost Nation (Rare Earth Records)
 Love Sculpture (Rare Earth Records)

M

 Magic (Rare Earth Records)
 Matrix (Rare Earth Records)
 The Messengers (Rare Earth Records)

P

 Bonnie Pointer (Motown Records)
 Poor Boys (Rare Earth Records)
 Power of Zeus (Rare Earth Records)
 Billy Preston (Motown Records)
 The Pretty Things (Rare Earth Records)

R

 Rare Earth (Rare Earth Records)
 Repairs (Rare Earth Records)
 Smokey Robinson (Tamla Records)
 Diana Ross (Motown Records)
 Rustix (Rare Earth Records)

S

 Valerie Simpson (Tamla Records)
 Sounds Nice (Rare Earth Records)
 The Spinners (a.k.a. the Original Detroit Spinners) (V. I. P. Records)
 Rose Stone (as Rose Banks) (Motown Records)
 Dennis Stoner (Rare Earth Records)`
 Stoney & Meatloaf (Rare Earth Records)
 Sunday Funnies (Rare Earth Records)
 The Supremes (Motown Records)
 Switch (Gordy Records)

T
 Tata Vega (Tamla Records)
 Toe Fat (Rare Earth Records)
 Teena Marie (Gordy Records)

U

 UFO (Rare Earth Records)
 The Undisputed Truth (Gordy Records)

V

 Frankie Valli & the Four Seasons (MoWest/Motown Records)

W

 Leon Ware (Motown Records)
 Mary Wilson (Motown Records)
 Wolfe (Rare Earth Records)

X

 XIT (Rare Earth Records)

1980s & 1990s

 98 Degrees (Motown Records)
 702 (Motown Records)

A

 Georgio Allentini (Motown Records)
 Another Bad Creation (Motown Records)

B

 B.G.O.T.I. (BGOTI)
 Erykah Badu (Motown Records)
 Bobby M (Gordy Records)
 The Boys (Motown Records)
 Boyz II Men (Motown Records)

C

 Charlene (Motown Records)
 Angela Clemmons (Motown Records)

D

 Dazz Band (Motown Records)
 Desiree Coleman (Motown Records)
 DeBarge (Gordy Records)
 Bunny DeBarge (Motown Records)
 Chico DeBarge (Motown Records)
 El DeBarge (Gordy Records)

F

 Jose Feliciano (Motown Records)

G

 Siedah Garrett (Gordy Records)
 Valerie George (Motown Records)
 Johnny Gill (Motown Records)
 The Good Girls (Motown Records)
 Guinn (Motown Records)

H

 Sam Harris (Motown Records)

K

 Kreuz (Motown Records)

L

 Lost Boyz (Motown Records)
Lovesmith
 Michael Lovesmith
 Stacy Lattisaw (Motown Records)
 Bettye LaVette (Motown Records)

M

 Teena Marie (Gordy Records)
 Mary Jane Girls (Gordy Records)
 Carrie McDowell (Motown Records)
 Brian McKnight (Motown Records)
 MC Trouble (Motown Records)
 Michael McDonald
 Misa  (Motown Records)
 Debelah Morgan (Motown Records)
N
 Nikita Germaine (Motown Records)
P

 Pal (Motown Records)
 The Pointer Sisters (Motown Records)

Q

 Queen Latifah (Motown Records)

R

 Lionel Richie (Motown Records)
 Rockwell (Motown Records)

S

 Phyllis St. James (Motown Records)
 Shanice (Motown Records)
 Stone City Band (Gordy Records)

T

 Felicia Taylor (Motown Records)
 Today (Motown Records)
 Tony! Toni! Toné! (Motown Records)

V
 Vanity (Motown Records)

W

 Jason Weaver (Motown Records)
 Bruce Willis (Motown Records)

Y

 Val Young (Gordy Records)
 Yours Truly (Motown Records)

Z

 Zhané (Illtown/Motown Records)

21st century

A

 Akon
 India.Arie
 Ashanti
 Avery

B

 Lil Baby
 Babyface
 Bankroll Freddie
 Drake Bell
 Yummy Bingham
 Black Coffey
 Toni Braxton
 Trina Broussard

D

 Donnie

H

 Dave Hollister

J

 Mila J
 Jada

K

 Kem
 Sebastian Kole

L

 La'Porsha Renae
 Latif
 Lil Durk (The Voice of the Heroes) with Lil Baby 
 Lil Yachty 
 Lindsay Lohan (Only the Single "Bossy")
 London

M

 Meechy Baby
 Chrisette Michele
 Migos
 Mýa

N

 Nelly 
 Ne-Yo
 Njomza

O

 Matt Ox

Q

 Quavo

R

 Dina Rae
 Jimmy Robbins
 Kevin Ross
 Kelly Rowland 
 Bailey Rubero

S

 SafetySuit
 Tiwa Savage
 Remy Shand
 Sharissa
 Shiny Toy Guns
 Shontelle
 Sparkle
 Suai

T

 Takeoff
 Trick Trick

U

 UnoTheActivist

V

 The Veer Union
 Vince Staples
 Vita Chambers

W

 Waii
 Will Biondo

Y
 YoungBoy Never Broke Again  (I Rest My Case January 2023)
 P Yungin

Z

 Zion

Motown